is a Japanese one-shot web manga written and illustrated by Tatsuki Fujimoto. It was published on Shueisha's Shōnen Jump+ in July 2021.

Plot
 is an elementary schooler with a talent for drawing manga, which she publishes in the school's paper. After being lauded for her exceptional skills, she finds herself challenged by another student named , who begins publishing her own manga alongside Fujino's but demonstrates herself as the superior artist between the two. Infuriated by this, Fujino throws herself into improving her art skills, which leads to her alienating her friends and family as she obsesses over overcoming Kyomoto. In spite of improvements, Fujino fails to reach Kyomoto's standards and quits drawing. When her class graduates to middle school, Fujino is tasked with delivering Kyomoto's diploma to her, as she is an agoraphobic truant who never left her house. Fujino enters Kyomoto's house and finds piles of sketchbooks. Finding a slip of paper, she draws a yonkoma mocking Kyomoto, but it inadvertently enters Kyomoto's room, alerting her to Fujino's presence. Kyomoto comes out of her room to meet Fujino, revealing herself as a huge fan who had been following her manga in the school paper for quite some time. Extremely flattered by Kyomoto's enthusiastic idolization of her, Fujino claims to have plans to submit manga to contests and takes up drawing again.

The two eventually team up to create manga, submitting multiple one-shots that receive high praise. During their teenage years, Fujino is told that she will be serialized, but Kyomoto opts to not join her as she wishes to get formal education in art. Fujino continues on without her, working on her manga Shark Kick which becomes popular enough to receive an anime adaptation.

One day, Fujino receives news of a mass murder at an art college, and discovers that Kyomoto was one of the casualties. Overcome with guilt over the possibility that she had indirectly led Kyomoto to her death by inspiring her to pursue an art career, Fujino returns to Kyomoto's house and tears up the yonkoma she drew years ago. A scrap slips into Kyomoto's room and seemingly time travels to the fateful day when the two meet. Kyomoto is too alarmed by the scrap to exit her room, preventing her from meeting Fujino. Despite this, she still develops a genuine interest in an art career and attends the college anyways. She is nearly killed by the mass murderer, but is saved by Fujino, who apprehends the would-be killer. The two catch up as Fujino is loaded into an ambulance for injuries, and Fujino offers to create manga with Kyomoto.

Returning home, Kyomoto draws a yonkoma of Fujino saving her from the murderer. A gust of wind blows the manga out of her room, and into the view of Fujino back in the regular timeline. Shocked by the manga, Fujino enters Kyomoto's room, finding an open window and multiple copies of Shark Kick, showing that in spite of their falling out Kyomoto never stopped looking up to her.

Still despairing over her life choices, Fujino denounces drawing, only to remember all the times her manga made Kyomoto happy. Fujino returns to work and continues drawing manga, having taped Kyomoto's yonkoma above her workstation to remind her of why she continues with such a seemingly unfulfilling life.

Release
The 143-page one-shot web manga Look Back, written and illustrated by Tatsuki Fujimoto, was published on Shueisha's Shōnen Jump+ online platform on July 19, 2021. The chapter was collected by Shueisha in a single volume, released on September 3, 2021.

The chapter was published online in English by Viz Media and Shueisha's Manga Plus platform. In February 2022, Viz Media announced that they had licensed the manga and the volume was published on September 20, 2022.

On August 2, 2021, it was announced that a scene depicting a man having a "paranoid episode" going into an art school with an axe, claiming plagiarism from a student, was altered post-publication due to readers feedback. Some readers pointed out similarities between the scene and the 2019 Kyoto Animation arson attack. There were also concerns that portraying a schizophrenic man as a mass murderer could stigmatize the mental illness.

Reception
Look Back was acclaimed in Japan. It reached 2.5 million reads on the first date of publication, and reached over 4 million reads in two days.

The tankōbon volume sold 73,912 copies in its first week of release and 80,186 copies in the second, which placed it fourth and third, respectively, on Oricon's weekly manga chart.

Look Back topped the Takarajimasha's Kono Manga ga Sugoi! 2022 list of best manga for male readers. It ranked #29 on the 2022 "Book of the Year" list by Da Vinci magazine. It achieved the special prize of the 2021 Twitter Japan's Trend Awards. The manga placed first on "The Best Manga 2022 Kono Manga wo Yome!" ranking by Freestyle magazine. It was also nominated for the 15th Manga Taishō in 2022 and placed second with 68 points.

Writer and editor Kazushi Shimada ranked it first on his top 10 manga of 2021. Sheena McNeil of Sequential Tart gave it a 7 out of 10. McNeil compared the story to Fujimoto's Chainsaw Man, stating that while Look Back is not a gore and violence story, it has the same type of storytelling, which "takes a character that's not all that likeable and makes us like them by challenging their point of view and having them grow." McNeil also praised the art, noting a "nice realism to it", and its visual pacing. Danica Davidson of Otaku USA praised the manga for its story and called the artwork "very impressive", noting how the art style changes over the course of the manga, "sometimes being incredibly detailed." Davidson concluded: "Look Back is melancholic, bittersweet and unique, and a great opportunity for Fujimoto to show off his skills."

References

Further reading

External links
  
 
 

2021 manga
Coming-of-age anime and manga
Drama anime and manga
Horror anime and manga
Manga creation in anime and manga
One-shot manga
Shōnen manga
Shueisha manga
Thriller anime and manga
Viz Media manga